Alfredo Romero (born March 5, 1972) is a Puerto Rican track and field athlete specializing in the discus throw. He won multiple medals on regional level.

His personal best of 56.20 metres (2002) was the national record until 2012.

Competition record

References

1972 births
Living people
Puerto Rican male discus throwers
Athletes (track and field) at the 1999 Pan American Games
Athletes (track and field) at the 2011 Pan American Games
Central American and Caribbean Games silver medalists for Puerto Rico
Central American and Caribbean Games bronze medalists for Puerto Rico
Competitors at the 1998 Central American and Caribbean Games
Competitors at the 2002 Central American and Caribbean Games
Competitors at the 2006 Central American and Caribbean Games
Competitors at the 2010 Central American and Caribbean Games
Central American and Caribbean Games medalists in athletics
Pan American Games competitors for Puerto Rico
20th-century Puerto Rican people